Global Mall Xinzuoying Station is a shopping mall in Zuoying District, Kaohsiung, Taiwan that opened in April 2013.

History
 On February 29, 2012, Global Mall Xinzuoying Station held a groundbreaking ceremony.
 In April 2013, Global Mall Xinzuoying Station opened, it is the fifth store of Global Mall.
 In September 2020, the mall was renovated to include an outlet section.

See also
 List of tourist attractions in Taiwan
 Global Mall Taoyuan A8
 Global Mall Pingtung

References

External links

2013 establishments in Taiwan
Shopping malls in Kaohsiung
Shopping malls established in 2013